The Saguenay flood was a series of flash floods on July 19 and 20, 1996 that hit the Saguenay–Lac-Saint-Jean region of Quebec, Canada. It was the biggest overland flood in 20th-century Canadian history.

History 
Problems started after two weeks of constant rain, which severely engorged soils, rivers and reservoirs. The Saguenay region is a geological graben, which increased the effect of the sudden massive rains of July 19, 1996. In two days, rainfall accumulated that was "equivalent to the volume of water that tumbles over Niagara Falls in four weeks."

Over  of water flooded parts of Chicoutimi and La Baie, completely levelling an entire neighbourhood. More than 16,000 people were evacuated. The official death toll was ten,  but other sources (notably Canadian Geographic) cite ten. Estimates reach  in damages, a cost made greater by the disaster's occurrence at the height of the tourist season. Post-flood enquiries discovered that the network of dikes and dams protecting the city of Chicoutimi was poorly maintained. In the end, 488 homes were destroyed, 1,230 damaged, and 16,000 people evacuated from the entire area. An additional ten persons died in the mudslides produced by the incredible rain.

Legacy 
A small white house (referred to in French as La petite maison blanche, "The little white house") stood nearly unharmed in Chicoutimi while torrents of water rushed in on every side, and it became the symbol of surviving the flood. It was owned by Jeanne d'Arc Lavoie-Genest. With its foundation still highly exposed after the flooding, it has been preserved in Saguenay (the city name has changed) as a historical park and museum commemorating the flood.

An unexpected effect of the flood was to cover the heavily contaminated sediments at the bottom of the Saguenay and Ha! Ha! Because of this, research has shown that the old sediments are no longer a threat to ecosystems and the river will not have to be dredged and treated to control contamination.

The Ha! Ha! Pyramid was created to memorialise the flood.

References

External links
CBC Digital Archives - The Saguenay Flood
"Bilan du Siècle", University of Sherbrooke 
Meteorological Service of Canada: Top Ten Weather Stories of 1996
Project Saguenay, The scientific team doing research on the ecological effects of the flood.

 

1996 disasters in Canada
Floods in Canada
History of Saguenay, Quebec
1996 natural disasters
1996 floods in North America
Natural disasters in Quebec
1996 in Quebec
July 1996 events in Canada